Sueyoshi is a Japanese surname. Notable people with the surname include:

Amy Sueyoshi, American academic
, Japanese footballer
, Japanese singer, actor and dancer
, Japanese footballer

See also
Sueyoshi, Kagoshima, a former town in Soo District, Kagoshima Prefecture, Japan

Japanese-language surnames